Murtada Quli is a Turkic-derived Muslim male given name built from quli.

Morteza Qoli Khan Qajar
Morteza-Qoli Bayat
Morteza-Qoli Khan Hedayat
Murtuzaqulu Khan Bayat

See also
 Morteza Qoli Kandi
Turkic masculine given names